QArea Company is an IT outsourcing company operating in the markets of the US and Europe. The company is mainly specialized in custom software development, software testing, web applications development and mobile software development. QArea has its headquarters in Beverly Hills, California and its offshore development center in Lviv, Ukraine. The number of employees is about 350+ software engineers, managers and testers.

History

QArea Company was founded in 2001 by Max Garkavtsev, who is currently a CEO of the company. At that period the company was mainly operating in the fast-growing IT market  – Mobile&Wireless. During the period of 2001–2005 QArea had met a rapid business growth, and by the end of 2006 it was already operated with several business units.
In 2008 QArea became a Microsoft Certified Partner and in 2011 – Microsoft Gold Certified Partner. QArea is also working with Microsoft as an outsourcing provider.

Industry practices

 Projects in scalable internet services area (e-Commerce, e-Community, Web 2.0, WAP);
 Business process automation (CRM, Billing, Logistics)
 Mobile and Wireless technologies (VoIP, GPRS, GPS, Wi-Fi, WAP, Bluetooth);
 GIS and navigation systems;
 Search systems with mobile access;
 IT security
 QA and software testing;

Partnership

 Microsoft
 Drupal.org
 American Chamber of Commerce in Ukraine
 Mobile Monday
 The Global Outsourcing 100® and The World's Best Outsourcing Advisors
 Community Sponsor of Joomla
 Ukrainian Hi-Tech Initiative
 CEEOA
 IAOP
 Acquia

References
QArea iOS Developers Celebrate 3 Year Anniversary.
QArea developers are going to visit The Huffington Post US office
Test-Driven Software Company QArea Group Assigned New QA Director
QArea participated in Dev Week 2012
QArea in Top Ukrainian Web & Software Developers by Clutch 2015
QArea in Top Software Application Testing Firms by Clutch 2015

External links

See also 
Offshore software development
Outsourcing
Information technology consulting

Outsourcing companies
Software companies of Ukraine